The Paul B. Baltes lecture is held annually by the Berlin-Brandenburg Academy of Sciences and Humanities. The lectures commenced in 2008 and are named after Paul Baltes, the German developmental psychologist.

Each year the Academy selects a leading international scientist to present the lecture which commemorates Paul Baltes` achievements in psychological research and his contributions to psychology.

The Paul B. Baltes lecture is a joint initiative of the psychology institutes in Berlin and Potsdam (Freie Universität, Humboldt-Universität, Technische Universität, Universität Potsdam, Max Planck Institute for Human Development) and is supported by the Margret M. and Paul B. Baltes Foundation.

The Lectures

 2008 Michael Posner: "Executive attention: Its origins, development, and functions".
 2009 Lynn Hasher: "Age-Related Consequences of Attention Regulation and Dysregulation".  
 2010 John Nesselroade: "The Person-Oriented Perspective in Psychology". 
 2011 Andrew Meltzoff: "The Development of Social Cognition: Imitation, Cultural Stereotypes and Identity Formation in Children".
 2012 Jutta Heckhausen: "A Motivational Theory of Life-Span Development".
 2013 Wendy Rogers: "Human-Robot Interaction:Understanding the Potential of Robots for Older Adults".
 2014 Brent W. Roberts
 2015 Ray Dolan: "Circuits for Social Cognition". 
 2016 Diane Poulin-Dubois: "The developmental origins of selective trust".
 2017 Kevin Warwick: "Neural implants for therapy and enhancement".
 2018 Denny Borsboom: "Network approaches to psychopathology".
 2019 David Poeppel: "The Auditory System and the Motor System, in Time".
 2020 Nora Newcombe: "Affordances and Representations: Understanding Mental Rotation, Perspective Taking and Spatial Reorientation".
 2021 Peter Hancock: “Time to Think of Time”.
 2022 Stephan Lewandowsky: “Demagoguery, Technology, and Cognition: Addressing the Threats to Democracy”.

References 

Awards established in 2008
Science lecture series
German science and technology awards
Berlin-Brandenburg Academy of Sciences and Humanities